Larche may refer to the following places in France:

Larche, Alpes-de-Haute-Provence, a commune in the department of Alpes-de-Haute-Provence
Larche, Corrèze, a commune in the department of Corrèze
Col de Larche, the French name for the Maddalena Pass

oc:L'Archa